Roger Vigneron (19 June 1910 – 14 December 1973) was a French middle-distance runner. He competed in the men's 3000 metres steeplechase at the 1932 Summer Olympics.

References

1910 births
1973 deaths
Athletes (track and field) at the 1932 Summer Olympics
French male middle-distance runners
French male steeplechase runners
Olympic athletes of France
Place of birth missing